Samuel Obeng may refer to:

Samuel Obeng (linguist) (born 1959), Ghanaian linguist
Samuel Obeng (footballer) (born 1997), Ghanaian footballer